The women's road time trial, one of the cycling events at the 2012 Olympic Games in London, took place on 1 August in southwest London and Surrey. Kristin Armstrong of the United States was the defending champion. The competition consisted of a time trial over one lap of a  course, with staggered starts.

Armstrong retained the title and won the gold medal with a winning time of 37 minutes 34.82 seconds. Judith Arndt from Germany was second and won silver, while Olga Zabelinskaya of Russia collected bronze.

Schedule 
All times are British Summer Time

Course
The competition consisted of a time trial over one lap of a  course, with staggered starts. Starting and finishing at the historic Hampton Court Palace, the course passed through areas of southwest London and Surrey including Esher and Kingston upon Thames.

Results
The provisional entry list was published on 23 July, and the confirmed start list of 24 riders on 31 July.

References

External links

Women's road race
2012 in women's road cycling
Cycling at the Summer Olympics – Women's individual time trial
Women's events at the 2012 Summer Olympics